The fifth season of Let's Dance began on 14 March 2012. Sylvie van der Vaart and Daniel Hartwich returned as hosts, while Joachim Llambi, Motsi Mabuse, and Roman Frieling all returned as judges. The jury Maite Kelly joined replacing Harald Glööckler.

This was Kelly's only season. Also Frieling did not return for season 6. In 2013, the winner Magdalena Breszka returned for the Christmas Special as one of the contestants.

Couples

Judges scores

Red numbers indicates the lowest score for each week.
Green numbers indicates the highest score for each week.
 indicates the couple eliminated that week.
 indicates the returning couple that finished in the bottom two.
 indicates the couple that didn't perform due to personal reasons.
 indicates the couple that withdrew from the competition.
 indicates the couple was eliminated but later returned to the competition.
 indicates the winning couple.
 indicates the runner-up couple.
 indicates the third-place couple.

Averages 
This table only counts for dances scored on a traditional 30-points scale.

Highest and lowest scoring performances 
The best and worst performances in each dance according to the judges' marks are as follows:

Couples' Highest and lowest scoring performances
According to the traditional 40-point scale.

Weekly scores and songs

Week 1 
Unless indicated otherwise, individual judges scores in the charts below (given in parentheses) are listed in this order from left to right: Roman Frieling, Maite Kelly, Motsi Mabuse, Joachim Llambi.

Running order

Week 2
Unless indicated otherwise, individual judges scores in the charts below (given in parentheses) are listed in this order from left to right: Roman Frieling, Maite Kelly, Motsi Mabuse, Joachim Llambi.

Running order

Week 3
Unless indicated otherwise, individual judges scores in the charts below (given in parentheses) are listed in this order from left to right: Roman Frieling, Maite Kelly, Motsi Mabuse, Joachim Llambi.

Running order

Week 4: Dirty Dancing Week
Unless indicated otherwise, individual judges scores in the charts below (given in parentheses) are listed in this order from left to right: Roman Frieling, Maite Kelly, Motsi Mabuse, Joachim Llambi.

Running order

Week 5
Unless indicated otherwise, individual judges scores in the charts below (given in parentheses) are listed in this order from left to right: Roman Frieling, Maite Kelly, Motsi Mabuse, Joachim Llambi.

Running order

Week 6: Personal Story Week
Unless indicated otherwise, individual judges scores in the charts below (given in parentheses) are listed in this order from left to right: Roman Frieling, Maite Kelly, Motsi Mabuse, Joachim Llambi.

Running order

Week 7
Unless indicated otherwise, individual judges scores in the charts below (given in parentheses) are listed in this order from left to right: Roman Frieling, Maite Kelly, Motsi Mabuse, Joachim Llambi.

Running order

Week 8
Unless indicated otherwise, individual judges scores in the charts below (given in parentheses) are listed in this order from left to right: Roman Frieling, Maite Kelly, Motsi Mabuse, Joachim Llambi.

Running order

Week 9
Unless indicated otherwise, individual judges scores in the charts below (given in parentheses) are listed in this order from left to right: Roman Frieling, Maite Kelly, Motsi Mabuse, Joachim Llambi.

Running order

Week 10
Unless indicated otherwise, individual judges scores in the charts below (given in parentheses) are listed in this order from left to right: Roman Frieling, Maite Kelly, Motsi Mabuse, Joachim Llambi.

Running order

Week 11
Unless indicated otherwise, individual judges scores in the charts below (given in parentheses) are listed in this order from left to right: Roman Frieling, Maite Kelly, Motsi Mabuse, Joachim Llambi.

Running order

Dance Chart

 Week 1: Cha-Cha-Cha or Waltz
 Week 2: Rumba or Jive or Salsa or Quickstep
 Week 3: One unlearned dance from Week 2 or Tango or Viennese Waltz or Tango Argentino
 Week 4: One unlearned dance from Week 1-3 (Dirty Dancing Special)
 Week 5: Tango or Samba or Foxtrot or Paso Doble
 Week 6: One unlearned dance (Personal Story Week)
 Week 7: One unlearned dance & Team Dance
 Week 8: One unlearned dance & Discofox-Marathon
 Week 9: One unlearned Latin & ballroom dance
 Week 10: Two unlearned dances
 Week 11: Redemption dance, Favourite dance, Freestyle

Call-out order
The table below lists the order in which the contestants' fates were revealed. The order of the safe couples doesn't reflect the viewer voting results.

 This couple came in first place with the judges.
 This couple came in last place with the judges.
 This couple was eliminated.
 This couple came in last place with the judges and was eliminated.
 This couple won the competition.
 This couple came in second in the competition.
 This couple came in third in the competition.
 This couple didn't dance due to personal reasons.
 This couple was eliminated but re-entered the competition after another couple decided to quit.

External links
 Official website

Let's Dance (German TV series)
2012 German television seasons

de:Let’s Dance (Fernsehsendung)
pl:Let's Dance (Niemcy)